{{Infobox television
| italic_title       =
| name               = 
| image              = 
| image_upright      = 
| image_size         = 
| caption            = 
| genre              = Travel documentary
| story              = 
| director           = 
| presenter          = Michael Portillo
| opentheme          = 
| endtheme           = 
| country            = United Kingdom
| language           = English
| num_seasons        = 1
| num_episodes       = 6
| list_episodes      = 
| executive_producer = 
| producer           = 
| location           = Australia
| runtime            = 60 minutes
| company            = Boundless
| distributor        = Fremantle
| network            = BBC Two
| picture_format     = 
| audio_format       = 
| first_aired        = 
| last_aired         = 
| related            = {{Plainlist|
 Great British Railway Journeys
 Great Continental Railway Journeys
 Railways of the Great War with Michael Portillo (2014)
 Great American Railroad Journeys
 Great Indian Railway Journeys
 Great Alaskan Railroad Journeys
 Great Canadian Railway Journeys
 Great Asian Railway Journeys}} 
}}Great Australian Railway Journeys'' is a BBC Two documentary series produced by Boundless and presented by Michael Portillo.

Broadcast
Great Australian Railway Journeys was first broadcast on BBC Two over six consecutive Saturday nights from 26 October 2019.

Episodes

References

External links
 

BBC television documentaries
BBC travel television series
Documentary television series about railway transport
Television series by Fremantle (company)
Television shows set in Australia
2010s British documentary television series
2010s British travel television series
2019 British television series debuts
2019 British television series endings
English-language television shows